"Dear Me" is a song written by Carson Whitsett and Scott Mateer, and recorded by American country music artist Lorrie Morgan.  It was released in February 1989 as the second single from her album Leave the Light On.  The song reached #9 on the Billboard Hot Country Singles chart in July 1989.

Chart performance

Year-end charts

References

1989 singles
Lorrie Morgan songs
Song recordings produced by Barry Beckett
RCA Records singles
Songs written by Carson Whitsett
1989 songs